Julie Ann Owens (born 17 October 1958) is an Australian former politician who served as a member of the Australian House of Representatives for Parramatta from 2004 to 2022 , when she retired from politics.

Early life
Owens was born on 17 October 1958 in Rockhampton, Queensland. Her family moved to Brisbane as a result of her father's career in the army. Owens attended Everton Park State High School. She went on to attend the Queensland Conservatorium of Music, studying piano under Nancy Weir and graduating with a Bachelor of Arts in Music.

Owens was a production manager at the Lyric Opera of Queensland from 1985 to 1989, where she was involved in productions of Aida, La bohème and Madama Butterfly. She later worked as a senior program officer at the Australia Council from 1989 to 1993 and CEO of the Association of Independent Record Labels from 2000 to 2004. She was also a small-business owner and completed an MBA at the University of Sydney.

Politics
Owens' first foray into politics came in 1996, when she stood as the Labor candidate in Division of North Sydney.  She was given very little chance of winning, given that North Sydney has long been a conservative stronghold, and was soundly defeated by Liberal Joe Hockey.

In the 2004 election campaign, Owens ran against the incumbent Liberal Ross Cameron. The campaign was notable for the admission by Cameron, a prominent family values campaigner, that he had had an extramarital affair, and Owens won the seat on preferences, despite a swing against the Labor Party in New South Wales.

Owens is a backbencher and has been a member of the House of Representatives Standing Committee for Communications, Information Technology and the Arts from December 2004. Although her seat was made notionally Liberal in a redistribution ahead of the 2007 election, she did not only retained her seat, but recorded a healthy swing of seven points.  She won a third term in 2010 with only a small swing against her, and narrowly won a fourth term in 2013 even as Labor lost government. Her 2013 victory marked only the second time (her initial win being the first) that the Liberals or their predecessors have been in government without holding Parramatta.

Following the resignation of Labor MP Craig Thomson as chair of the Economics Committee, Owens was appointed head of the Committee.

On 28 October 2021, Owens announced in Parliament that she would not contest the next election. The ALP made Eastern Suburbs businessman Andrew Charlton the candidate for the 2022 elections.

References

 

1958 births
Living people
Australian Labor Party members of the Parliament of Australia
Members of the Australian House of Representatives
Members of the Australian House of Representatives for Parramatta
Australian chief executives
Women members of the Australian House of Representatives
Griffith University alumni
University of Sydney alumni
People from Rockhampton
Labor Left politicians
21st-century Australian politicians
21st-century Australian women politicians
Australian music industry executives
20th-century Australian women